The 2005 NCAA Division III Men's Ice Hockey Tournament was the culmination of the 2004–05 season, the 22nd such tournament in NCAA history. It concluded with Middlebury defeating St. Thomas in the championship game 5-0. All First Round and Quarterfinal matchups were held at home team venues, while all succeeding games were played in Middlebury, Vermont.

Qualifying teams
The following teams qualified for the tournament. Automatic bids were offered to the conference tournament champion of seven different conferences with one at-large bid for the best remaining team from each region.

Format
The tournament featured four rounds of play. All rounds were Single-game elimination. For the three eastern Quarterfinals the teams were seeded according to their rankings with the top three teams serving as hosts. For the western quarterfinal, the top-ranked team awaited the winner of a play-in game between the lower-ranked teams.

Tournament bracket

Note: * denotes overtime period(s)

Record by conference

References

External links
Division III Men's Ice Hockey Record Book

 
NCAA Division III ice hockey